Brux may refer to:

 Brux, Vienne, a commune in the Vienne department in western France
 Brux, Aberdeenshire, in Scotland
Brux Castle, Aberdeenshire
 Brüx, the German name for the city of Most, in the Czech Republic

See also
Bruxism